Songs by Others is a Record Store Day exclusive extended play of covers performed by the Chicago artist Ezra Furman and her backing band The Boy-Friends. The release featured a 12-inch LP on clear heavyweight vinyl and a digital download sticker on the sleeve. Most of the tracks on the extended play were recorded at Studio Ballistico in Chicago. Other locations include Furman's own bedroom and two live radio performances.

Track listing

Artist notes
On the back of the jacket, Furman writes an explanation for the recording of the EP, reading:

Charts

References

2016 EPs
Ezra Furman albums
Record Store Day releases